Christian Solinas (born 2 December 1976) is an Italian politician, leader of the Sardinian Action Party and President of Sardinia.

Biography
Born in Cagliari, Solinas has been a long-time member of the Sardinian Action Party and has been regional councilor of transports from 2011 to 2014, under the presidency of Ugo Cappellacci.

In 2015, Solinas was elected Secretary of the Sardinian Action Party, leading the party towards right-wing positions, promoting a twinning with Matteo Salvini's Northern League. In the 2018 election, Solinas was elected to the Senate, becoming the only member of the Sardinian Action Party in the Senate and joining the League's parliamentary group.

Solinas graduated in Law at the University of Sassari in December 2018.

In November 2018, Solinas was appointed as the centre-right candidate for the office of President of Sardinia for the 2019 regional election, leading a coalition that includes the Sardinian Action Party, the League, Forza Italia, Brothers of Italy, the Union of the Centre, the Union of Sardinians, Fortza Paris, Energies for Italy and the Sardinian Reformers.

References

1976 births
Living people
21st-century Italian politicians
People from Cagliari
University of Sassari alumni
Senators of Legislature XVIII of Italy
Members of the Regional Council of Sardinia
Presidents of Sardinia
Sardinian Action Party politicians